Wikipedia bots are Internet bots (computer programs) that perform simple, repetitive tasks on Wikipedia. One prominent example of an internet bot used in Wikipedia is Lsjbot, which generated millions of short articles across various language editions of Wikipedia.

Activities 
Computer programs, called bots, have often been used to automate simple and repetitive tasks, such as correcting common misspellings and stylistic issues, or to start articles, such as geography entries, in a standard format from statistical data. Additionally, there are bots designed to automatically notify editors when they make common editing errors (such as unmatched quotes or unmatched parentheses).

Anti-vandalism bots like ClueBot NG are programmed to detect and revert vandalism quickly. Bots are able to indicate edits from particular accounts or IP address ranges, as occurred at the time of the shooting down of the MH17 jet incident in July 2014 when it was reported edits were made via IPs controlled by the Russian government.

Bots on Wikipedia must be approved before activation.

A bot once created up to 10,000 articles on the Swedish Wikipedia in a day.  According to Andrew Lih, the current expansion of Wikipedia to millions of articles would be difficult to envision without the use of such bots. The Cebuano, Swedish and Waray Wikipedias are known to have high numbers of bot-created content.

Types of bots 
One way to sort bots is by what activities they perform:
 content creation, such as by procedural generation
 fixing errors, such as by copy editing or addressing link rot
 adding connectors, such as with hyperlinks to content elsewhere
 tagging content with labels
 repairing vandalism, such as ClueBot NG
 clerk, updating reports
 archiving old discussions or tasks
 moderation systems to combat against spam or misconduct
 recommender systems to encourage users
 notifications, such as with push technology and pull technology

See also 
 Wikipedia:Bots
 Wikipedia:Bot policy
 Wikipedia:History of Wikipedia bots
 Wikidata item for Wikipedia:Bots, listing all Wikipedia:Bots project pages

References 

 
Internet bots
Bots